U.S. Highway 138 (US 138), commissioned in 1926, is an east–west U.S. Highway in Colorado and Nebraska that travels predominantly northeast to southwest, paralleling the South Platte River and Interstate 76 (I-76). Similarly to the spurs of the former US 66 and US 99, US 138 is an orphan route. US 38 was commissioned in 1926, but US 6 was extended over it to Long Beach, California (but was truncated to Bishop, California in 1964). Therefore, US 138 still meets its former parent route's path.

Route description

Colorado
U.S. 138 begins in Sterling at U.S. 6 and Business Loop 76.  It goes northeast and intersects Colorado State Highway 113 southwest of Iliff.  It becomes more easterly as it goes through Iliff, Proctor and Crook, where it intersects Colorado State Highway 55.  It continues on to Sedgwick, where it meets Colorado State Highway 59.  After passing through Ovid, it then meets U.S. Highway 385 west of Julesburg, and they overlap into Julesburg.  Also in Julesburg, U.S. 138 intersects Colorado State Highway 11.  U.S. 138 then leaves Julesburg going northeast and enters Nebraska.

Nebraska
Shortly after entering Nebraska, U.S. 138 intersects Interstate 80.  It continues east from I-80 and enters Big Springs.  At Big Springs, U.S. 138 turns north and ends at U.S. Highway 30.

History

The western terminus is in Sterling, Colorado, where it met U.S. Route 38 from 1926 to 1931 (US 38 became U.S. Route 6); the eastern terminus is at U.S. Route 30 north of Big Springs, Nebraska.   US 138 is an example of a "child" route that has long outlived its "parent"; before U.S. Route 99 was decommissioned in 1964, US 138 was the only US route to not have a "parent" route.

Major intersections

References

External links

Endpoints of U.S. Highway 138
Colorado Highways: Routes 120 to 139
The Nebraska Highways Page: Nebraska Highways 101 to 300
Nebraska Roads: Nebraska US Highways 136-183

38-1
38-1
38-1
1 38
Transportation in Logan County, Colorado
Transportation in Sedgwick County, Colorado
Transportation in Deuel County, Nebraska